Ryzvan Talibov (born 20 January 1998) is a Ukrainian karateka competing in the kumite 75 kg division. He is 2018 European Team Championships medalist.

In November 2021, he competed in the men's +84 kg event at the 2021 World Karate Championships held in Dubai, United Arab Emirates.

References

External links
 Ukrainian Karate Federation: Ryzvan Talibov

1998 births
Living people
Ukrainian male karateka
Competitors at the 2022 World Games
20th-century Ukrainian people
21st-century Ukrainian people